The 2019 Blaby District Council election took place on 2 May 2019 to elect members of the Blaby District Council in England. They were held on the same day as other local elections.

Results summary

Election result

|-

Ward results

Blaby South

Cosby with South Whetstone

Countesthorpe

Croft Hill

Ellis

Enderby & St. John's

Fairestone

Forest

Millfield

Muxloe

Narborough & Littlethorpe

Normanton

North Whetstone

Pastures

Ravenhurst & Fosse

Saxondale

Stanton & Flamville

Winstanley

References

2019 English local elections
May 2019 events in the United Kingdom
2019
2010s in Leicestershire